Abraham 'Abram' Fitzgibbon (23 January 1823 – 4 April 1887) was an Irish-born railroad engineer and a pioneer for narrow-gauge railways.

Career
In the early 1860s, Fitzgibbon was working at Dun Mountain Railway in Nelson, New Zealand, a horse-drawn line upon which he worked from 1860 ( gauge)

Fitzgibbon arrived in the colony of Queensland in June 1863. He was appointed  first chief engineer of Queensland Railways after a rise through the ranks in the early stages of the railway department development. The first operations of the Queensland Railways opened in 1865.

There was debate regarding the choice of gauge,  versus . It is claimed that Fitzgibbon said that the narrow gauge would be sufficient to last 25 or 30 years and was cheaper. Despite opposition from contemporaries, he successfully advocated for the use of narrow gauge or  track in Australia. By 1867, the controversies included the termination of Fitzgibbon's contract.

Death and legacy
Fitzgibbon died on 4 April 1887 at Moorside, Bushey Heath, Hertfordshire, England.

The Fitzgibbon suburb of Brisbane is named after Abraham Fitzgibbon.

Queensland railways continue to be  gauge to the present day.

See also 

 Three foot six inch gauge railways

Other narrow gauge pioneers  in order of influence:
 Carl Abraham Pihl (1825–1897) known for the Norwegian Railways  opened 1863  ; 
 Robert Fairlie (1831-1885) known for the Fairlie locomotive on Festiniog Railway introduced about 1865.  gauge.
 Thomas Hall (1823-1889) known for the Namaqualand Railway built 1868  ;  gauge
 Paul Decauville (1846–1922) known for the  Decauville system introduced 1875
 Everard Calthrop (1857–1927) known for the Barsi Light Railway opened 1897  ;  gauge.

References

External links 
 

1823 births
1887 deaths
Australian engineers
Australian people in rail transport
Rail transport in Queensland
Railway commissioners of Queensland